is an island in Japan, which is part of the Okinawa Islands and administered as Aguni Village in Shimajiri District, Okinawa Prefecture. It is located 60 km Northwest from Naha on Okinawa Island in East China Sea. It has an area of 7.64 km². It has one bar, one cop, no restaurants, no convenience stores and no taxis or buses. Besides the hotel, there are about 10 minshuku (guest houses) catering to the scuba divers who comprise the majority of visitors. The island manages commercial fishery, and its fishermen are usually also farmers. There is a port and an airstrip through which visitors can visit the island on a ferry or airplane.

Climate

References

Okinawa Islands
Islands of Okinawa Prefecture